Raosaheb Babasaheb Nimbalkar (1 December 1915 – 1 June 1965) was an Indian first-class cricketer. He was a right-handed batsman and a wicket-keeper who occasionally bowled leg breaks. He played from 1934 to 1953, initially for Maharashtra and then for Baroda. Nimbalkar never played Test cricket but he travelled to England in 1946 as India's reserve wicketkeeper, understudying Dattaram Hindlekar. Nimbalkar was born at Kolhapur, Maharashtra and died at Jalna, Maharashtra. He was the elder brother of B. B. Nimbalkar.

Nimbalkar made 63 first-class appearances, scoring 2,687 runs at an average of 30.19, with a highest innings of 132, one of four centuries. He held 84 catches and completed 41 stumpings, thus achieving nearly two dismissals per match.

References

Bibliography
 

1915 births
1965 deaths
Indian cricketers
Maharashtra cricketers
Baroda cricketers
West Zone cricketers
Hindus cricketers
People from Kolhapur
Wicket-keepers